Georgios Theodoridis (born December 12, 1972) is a Greek sprinter specializing in the 60 metres and 100 metres.

Born in Athens and raised in Kozani, he finished sixth at the 1998 European Indoor Championships, won the silver medal at the 2000 European Indoor Championships, finished seventh at the 2001 World Indoor Championships and won the bronze medal in at the 2004 World Indoor Championships. He also competed at the Olympic Games in 2000 and 2004, the World Championships in 1999 and 2003 and the World Indoor Championships in 1999 World Indoor Championships and 2003 World Indoor Championships without reaching the final round.

His personal best at 60 metres is 6.51 seconds, achieved at the 2000 European Indoor Championships in Ghent. His personal best in 100 metres is 10.17 seconds, achieved during the 2003 World Championships in Paris. This time ranks him eighth among Greek 100 metres sprinters./:)

Honours

References
  

1972 births
Living people
Greek male sprinters
Athletes (track and field) at the 2000 Summer Olympics
Athletes (track and field) at the 2004 Summer Olympics
Olympic athletes of Greece
World Athletics Indoor Championships medalists
Sportspeople from Kozani
PAOK athletes
Athletes from Athens